Vulpeni is a commune in Olt County, Oltenia, Romania. It is composed of ten villages: Cotorbești, Gropșani, Mardale, Pescărești, Plopșorelu, Prisaca, Simniceni, Tabaci, Valea Satului and Vulpeni.

References

Communes in Olt County
Localities in Oltenia